is a 2018 Japanese animated film based on the Yuki Midorikawa's manga and anime Natsume's Book of Friends. The film is produced by Shuka and directed by Hideki Itō under the chief direction of Takahiro Omori; with an original story written by Sadayuki Murai under Midorikawa's supervision. It was released in Japan on September 29, 2018. Plot 
Natsume travels to a town where his grandmother Reiko stayed in for a bit, there he meets an acquaintance of hers. Meanwhile Nyanko-sensei follows some spirits into the woods and end up with a weird seed stuck on him that later becomes a spirit tree in Natsume's front yard.

 Voice cast 

Production
The cast of the television series also returned to reprise their roles. Uru to perform the film's music "Remember".

Release
The film was released in Japan on September 29, 2018. In Japan, the film was released on Blu-ray and DVD on May 29, 2019.

ReceptionNatsume's Book of Friends the Movie'' grossed $17,473,797 at the box office.

References

External links 
  
 

Japanese animated films
2010s Japanese-language films
2018 anime films
2018 films
Anime films based on manga
Aniplex